George Henry Hunter (1 February 1874 – 18 April 1944) was an Australian rules footballer who played with St Kilda in the Victorian Football League (VFL).

References

External links 		
		

1874 births
1944 deaths
Australian rules footballers from Victoria (Australia)
St Kilda Football Club players